Max Llewellyn (born 13 January 1999) is a Welsh rugby union player who plays for Cardiff Rugby as a centre. He is a Wales under-20 international.

He attended Ysgol Gyfun Gymraeg Glantaf, and also Cardiff Met, where he played for their rugby team.

Llewellyn made his debut for Cardiff in 2017 having previously played for the Cardiff academy. He is also a fluent  Welsh speaker.

His father is 92-cap Welsh international Gareth Llewellyn. His uncle, Glyn Llewellyn, also represented Wales.

On March 20th 2023, it was announced that Llewellyn had signed a contract for Premiership Rugby side Gloucester Rugby for the 23/24 season.

References

External links 
Cardiff Rugby profile

1999 births
Living people
Cardiff Rugby players
Rugby union players from Kingston upon Thames
Welsh rugby union players
Rugby union centres